Mountain Skies Observatory  is a privately owned astronomical observatory located in Lyman, Wyoming, USA. It is one of the largest observatories in the region and is used frequently by the Bridger Valley Astronomical Society.

See also
List of astronomical observatories

References

External links
Mountain Skies Observatory Clear Sky Clock Forecasts of observing conditions.

Astronomical observatories in Wyoming
Buildings and structures in Uinta County, Wyoming